Teleclita is a genus of moths in the family Notodontidae. The genus was described by Turner in 1903.

Species
Teleclita cathana Schaus, 1928 (Philippines) 
Teleclita dryinopa (Dodd, 1902) (Australia)
Teleclita grisea (Swinhoe, 1892) (China, Thailand, India, Laos, Vietnam)
Teleclita insignifica Rothschild, 1917
Teleclita strigata (Moore, 1879) (Nepal, India, Thailand, Malaysia Sri Lanka, Vietnam)
Teleclita sundana Holloway, 1983 (Singapore, Borneo, Sumatra, Philippines)

References

 - with images

Notodontidae
Moth genera